Miss Perú is the national beauty pageant of the Republic of Peru. The contest gathers participants from all over the nation, including Peruvian women representing their community overseas. Having been broadcast by all the major television networks in the country during its history, the pageant is currently broadcast by América Televisión.

The president of the organization and national director is Miss Peru 1987 and Miss Universe 1987 finalist, Jessica Newton. The winner traditionally represents Peru at the Miss Universe pageant while the runners-up also have the chance to represent the country internationally at contests such as Miss Supranational and Miss Grand International.

A complete separate contest owned by Ernesto "Tito" Paz has the rights of selection for Miss World and Miss Earth, while another contest owned by Rossana Ramos Miranda has the rights for Miss International.

This pageant is known for producing Latin America's first ever Miss Universe crown, which was achieved by then 17-year-old Gladys Zender who won the title of Miss Universe 1957.

The current Miss Peru is Alessia Rovegno who represented Lima and won the title on June 14, 2022.

History
Peru has competed in the Miss Universe pageant since 1952 and in the Miss World pageant since 1959. In the Miss Universe pageant, their first representative was Ada Gabriela Bueno, who was crowned as the first Miss Peru in a ceremony at the Lawn Tennis Club of Lima and competed in Miss Universe 1952. Bueno traveled to Long Beach, California to represent her country, but failed to enter the group of semifinalists.

The runner-ups and finalists of the annual Miss Peru and Miss World Peru pageants are sent to compete in other events, such as Miss Supranational, Miss Grand International, Miss Eco International, Reina Hispanoamericana, Miss United Continents, Miss Top Model of the World, Miss Supertalent, Reinado Internacional del Cafe, Reinado Mundial del Banano, Reinado Mundial de la Ganadería, Miss Intercontinental, Miss Globe, Miss Landscapes International, Miss America Latina, Miss Asia Pacific, Miss Tourism Queen International, Miss Bikini International, and Miss Atlantico Internacional, among others.

In the 1950s, Peru was one of the few South American countries that competed in major international competitions such as the Miss Universe and Miss World pageants. The country became consistent joining the group of semifinals five times in the 1950s and four times during the 1960s. Peru is known for having the first Spanish-speaking Miss Universe in 1957, Gladys Zender.

Peru participated in the Miss World pageant for the first time in 1959, represented by María Elena Rossel Zapata, who was ranked as the 1st runner-up. This was the first time that a Latin American country won 2nd place in the Miss World pageant.

In 1967, Peru won the Miss World crown for the first time with Madeline Hartog-Bel, exactly ten years after Gladys Zender won the Miss Universe pageant in 1957, Hartog-Bel had previously participated in Miss Universe 1966, where she placed among the 15 semifinalists.

In 1973, Peru did not send its representative, Mary Núñez Bartra, to the Miss Universe Pageant, because she was prevented from participating by the president of the republic, Juan Velasco Alvarado. He considered the contest was the product of American capitalism, and a country with which he did not have good relations. This was the only occasion in which a Miss Peru did not participate in the Miss Universe except for in 1955 and 1974, when no contest was held. Given the refusal of Alvarado, Bartra was sent to Miss World 1973 in London, England.

In 1982, Peru became the first South American country to host the Miss Universe pageant. Miss Universe 1982 was held in the Coliseo Amauta in Lima on July 26, 1982. The winner was the 18 year old Karen Baldwin from Canada, who became the first representative of her country to win the Miss Universe title. A group of twelve semifinalists were chosen from a total of 77 candidates, representatives from the many countries and territories that competed in this version of the contest. This was the sixteenth consecutive spirited contest for the American television presenter Bob Barker. The show was broadcast via satellite by the U.S. network CBS in collaboration with Panamericana Televisión. In this edition, Peru was represented by Francesca Zaza, who was among the 12 semifinalists and won the prize for Best National Costume.

In 1987, Jessica Newton was chosen to represent the country in Miss Universe 1987 in Singapore. The winner of this edition was the Chilean Cecilia Bolocco. Newton was among the 10 semifinalists. Years later Newton took the franchise of the Miss Peru pageant and was responsible for organizing the event and preparing Peruvian queens for the Miss Universe and Miss World for 12 years.

After many years in 1996, Peru reappeared in the contest with Natali Sacco, who entered in the top 10 in Miss Universe 1996, and in 1998, Mariana Larrabure also entered the top 10 in Miss World 1998. Four years later, in 2002, Marina Mora joined the Top 5, winning third place in the Miss World 2002 pageant. The following year Claudia Ortiz de Zevallos placed in the Top 15 in Miss Universe 2003 and took the second place prize for Best National Costume, and Claudia Hernández placed in the top 20 in Miss World 2003 and won the award for Best Evening Gown. This was so far the only time that Peru had classified the same year in the Miss Universe and Miss World.

In terms of Miss Universe, since the new millennium, Peru came back to the final round of the competition when Claudia Ortiz de Zevallos was a semifinalist in the Miss Universe 2003 pageant held in Panama, then also joined the group of semifinalists in the Miss Earth 2003 pageant. Liesel Holler failed to reach the semifinals in 2004, but like her predecessor also joined the group of semifinalists in the Miss Earth 2004 pageant. Débora Sulca made Peru's comeback in the contest in 2005, placing in the Top 10 and finishing 6th overall (Peru's highest placement to date since winning the crown in 1957).

At Miss World, Peru featured a successful streak of three placements that ended with its second title. Marina Mora finished as 2nd runner-up in the 2002 edition and her successor Claudia Hernandez placed in the Top 20 in 2003. In 2004, Peru returned to international glory in the field of beauty pageants in December 2004, when María Julia Mantilla won the Miss World title thanks to a worldwide vote through text messages and phone calls, which occurred for the first time in the history of the event. She won the crown of Miss World 2004. The first runner-up was Claudia Cruz, from the Dominican Republic, and the second runner-up was Nancy Randall, from the United States.

In 2012, Nicole Faverón made Peru's return to the Miss Universe pageant after seven years of absence by placing at Miss Universe 2012.

Valeria Piazza became the 18th Peruvian to place in Miss Universe history, by making the Top 13 at Miss Universe 2016.

Peru gained its fourth international crown with the title of Miss Grand International 2017, won by Maria Jose Lora. The country returned to the placement circle of Miss World after a 13-year drought when Pamela Sanchez made the Top 40 on the final night.

Notable winners

Peru is one of the 20 countries in the history of pageantry to have won the two most prestigious crowns of Miss Universe and Miss World at least once each.

After winning Latin America's first ever Miss Universe crown, Gladys Zender became very popular and well known in her country. Later she married the politician Antonio Meier and is the mother of the famous Peruvian actor Christian Meier.

Jessica Newton, Miss Peru 1987, after the international contest went to Los Angeles, California where she studied and also worked with Paramount Pictures. Then she worked in Lima editing different magazines. From 1992 to 2004 she was the organizer of the Miss Peru pageant. Since 2007 she has been the representative of  Condé Nast, which publishes magazines Vogue, Glamour, GQ and Vanity Fair for Latin America and Mexico. In 2015, she returned to completely take over the national pageant and start a new beginning of the Miss Perú Organization. After an 11-year hiatus, her first Peruvian queens as national director were Laura Spoya and Valeria Piazza.

Carmela Stein, Miss Peru 1961 and Miss Universe 1961 finalist, currently lives in Mexico and is the mother of the famous Mexican actress Ana Patricia Rojo.

Olga Zumaran, who was Miss Peru 1978 and Miss Peru Mundo 1981, began an acting career after her reigns. She was later elected as Mrs. Perú 2009.

Karina Calmet, Miss Peru 1994, became a television presenter and actress. Since 2009 she was part of the Peruvian comedy series Al Fondo Hay Sitio, which ended in 2016.

Frieda Holler, Miss Peru 1965; Carmen Amelia Ampuero, Miss Peru 1972; Mónica Chacón, Miss Peru Mundo 1996; Viviana Rivasplata, Miss Peru 2001; and Marina Mora, Miss Peru Mundo 2002 have had success in the business category and occasionally participate in various television shows.

Like Gladys Zender and Madeline Hartog-Bel, María Julia Mantilla also became a well-known and popular figure in her country. She began working for the Ford Model Agency in London, and then debuted as a businesswoman and a television presenter. She was the host of the variety TV show Al Aire on America Televisión, which ended in 2016 and was planning a new TV project in 2017.

Adriana Zubiate, Miss Peru 2002, was a finalist in Bailando por un sueño in 2008. Claudia Hernández eventually worked as the morning news reporter at Buenos Días, Perù on Panamericana Televisión. Karen Schwarz, Miss Peru 2009, hosted some TV shows in Frecuencia Latina up until the end of 2016 due to expecting her first child.

Natalie Vértiz, Miss Peru 2011; and Nicole Faverón, Miss Peru 2012, took part in the local Peruvian television industry after their reigns. Vertiz currently works as part of the "Espectáculos" section reporter in América Television's news networks. Faverón went on to follow involvement in the clothing business industry, opening a boutique of her own in Lima.

Other wins

There are other international pageants in which Peru has achieved success by winning the title or placing in the semifinals.

Notable wins: Miss Intercontinental 1971, 1987, Mrs. World 1989, 2016, Miss America Latina 1991, 2016, Miss Asia Pacific International 1994, 2001, Reina Internacional del Café 1997, Miss Teenager World 2002, 2007, Miss Caraïbes Hibiscus 2004, 2005, Miss Perla Mundial del Pacifico 2007, Miss Tourism Queen International 2008, Miss Teenager Universe 2008, Miss Beauty International 2009, Miss Continentes Unidos 2010, Reina Internacional de la Ganadería 2015, World Miss University 2016, Reina Mundial del Banano 2016, Miss Supertalent of the World 2016, Miss Grand International 2017, Top Model of the World 2018, Miss Atlantico Internacional 2018, Miss Eco International 2019.

Runner up or semi-final entries: Miss International, Miss Earth, Miss Teen International, Miss Maja Mundial, Reina Hispanoamericana, Miss Italia Nel Mondo, Mrs. Universe, Miss Supranational.

Titleholders
The following women have been crowned Miss Peru:

Titleholders under Miss Perú org.
The following women have represented Peru in the Big Four international beauty pageants, the four major international beauty pageants for women. These are Miss World, Miss Universe, Miss International and Miss Earth.

Miss Perú Universo

The winner of Miss Perú represents her country at the Miss Universe. On occasion, when the winner does not qualify (due to age) for either contest, a runner-up is sent.

Miss Perú Mundo

The 1st runner-up of Miss Peru represented her country at Miss World. In 2006 there was a separate contest called Miss Perú Mundo competition which selected a winner to Miss World. In 2007 there was Miss World Peru under Miss Peru which crowned two winners, Miss Perú and Miss Perú Mundo. From 2010 to 2013 the 1st Runner-up returned to comeback at Miss World. In 2014 the format returned to the 2007 version. Begun in 2015, the Miss Perú Mundo officially named an independent as a national franchise holder in Peru to Miss World.

Miss Perú Internacional

The second title of Miss Peru represented her country at Miss International. Started in 2005, the new foundation Miss Internacional Perú/Miss Perú Internacional (MIP) holds a national competition to choose a winner for Miss International. In 2007 and 2016 Miss Peru franchised the license of Miss International. One of the runners-up went to the Miss International pageant.

Miss Perú Tierra

Miss Peru used to send a delegate to participate in the annual Miss Earth pageant. In 2014, another organization, Miss Earth Peru, was established to select a representative for the Miss Earth pageant.

References

External links
Miss International Perú official website

Peru
 
Beauty pageants in Peru
Peruvian awards
Peru
Recurring events established in 1952
1952 establishments in Peru